The 1970 Arab League summit was held on September 27 in Cairo, Egypt as an extraordinary Arab League Summit. The summit came in the aftermath of the bloody events of the  Jordanian Civil War, and the clashes between the Palestinian Liberation Organization and King Hussein of Jordan. Egyptian president Gamal Abdul Nasser succeeded in getting both King Hussein of Jordan and Yasser Arafat, the chairman of the PLO, to end the bloody battle between Jordanians and the Palestinian fedayeen. The summit concluded its work on September 28, hours before Nasser died.
The summit was boycotted by Iraq, Syria, Algeria and Morocco.

1970 Arab League summit
Arab–Israeli conflict
1970 in Egypt
Diplomatic conferences in Egypt
20th-century diplomatic conferences
1970 in international relations
Arab League
Arab League
1970s in Cairo
September 1970 events in Africa